Dieuryneura is a genus of flies in the family Stratiomyidae.

Species
Dieuryneura stigma (Giglio-Tos, 1891)

References

Stratiomyidae
Brachycera genera
Diptera of North America